A British national, or United Kingdom national, is a person who possesses a type of British nationality. This includes anyone who is a:

 British citizen
 British Overseas Territories citizen
 British Overseas citizen
 British subject (as defined under the British Nationality Act 1981)
 British National (Overseas)
 British protected person

All British nationals, except for British protected persons, are Commonwealth citizens. During the period in which the United Kingdom was a member of the European Union, only British citizens, British Overseas Territories citizens connected with Gibraltar, and British subjects with right of abode in the United Kingdom were considered European Union citizens. Additionally, while British citizens residing in or connected with the Channel Islands and Isle of Man were considered EU citizens, those without a connection through residency (defined as five consecutive years) or descent (a UK-born parent or grandparent) to the United Kingdom were specifically excluded from the right of freedom of movement in other EU countries.

References 

British nationality law